Hanfu Movement, also known as the Hanfu Revival Movement, is a cultural movement seeking to revitalize Han Chinese fashion that developed in China since 2003.

It is a social movement which aims at popularizing hanfu and integrating traditional Chinese elements into the design of modern clothing, as a way to promote traditional Chinese culture. Participants and supporters of the Hanfu Movement call themselves tongpao; a term, which comes from the :

The term tongpao is literally translated as "wearing the same style of robe" and is also a pun of tongbao meaning "fellow compatriots".

Historical background
When the Manchus established the Qing dynasty, there were three Manchu cultural impositions which were placed upon the Han people: the queue hairstyle which was universally implemented and strictly implemented, the wearing of Manchu-style clothing in official dress, and learning of Manchu language; the implementation of the latter two was more limited in both scope and effects.

The Tifayifu policy

Upon establishing the Qing dynasty, the Manchu authorities also issued a decree known as Tifayifu (剃髮易服), forcing all its male citizens to adopt Manchu hairstyle by shaving their hair on the front of the head and braiding the hair on the back of the head into pigtails known as queue (辮子), as well as to adopt Manchu clothing such as changshan (長衫). Those who violate the Tifayifu policy were heavy punished, even with death sentences. Consequently, this policy caused significant discontentment among other ethnicity, including the Han Chinese, and led to various uprisings across the country. However, those resistances were violently suppressed. Qing Manchu prince Dorgon initially canceled the order for all men in Ming territories south of the Great wall (post 1644 additions to the Qing) to shave. It was a Han official from Shandong, Sun Zhixie and Li Ruolin who voluntarily shaved their foreheads and demanded Qing Prince Dorgon impose the queue hairstyle on the entire population which led to the queue order. The Qing imposed the shaved head hairstyle on men of all ethnicities under its rule even before 1644 like upon the Nanai people in the 1630s who had to shave their foreheads. The men of certain ethnicities who came under Qing rule later like Salar people and Uyghur people already shaved all their heads bald so the shaving order was redundant. However, the shaving policy was not enforced in the Tusi autonomous chiefdoms in Southwestern China where many minorities lived. There was one Han Chinese Tusi, the Chiefdom of Kokang populated by Han Kokang people.

Certain groups of people were exempted from the Tifayifu, including women, children, and clergies. Throughout the Qing dynasty, Han Chinese women continued to wear the styles of clothing from the Ming dynasty. Also, neither Taoist priests nor Buddhist monks were required to wear the queue by the Qing; they continued to wear their traditional hairstyles: completely shaved heads for Buddhist monks, and long hair in the traditional Chinese topknot for Taoist priests. Taoist priests continued to wear Taoist traditional dress (a style of hanfu called "daopao") and did not adopt Qing Manchu dress. After the Qing was toppled in the 1911 Xinhai Revolution, the Taoist dress and topknot was adopted by the ordinary gentry and "Society for Restoring Ancient Ways" (復古會) on the Sichuan and Hubei border where the White Lotus and Gelaohui operated.

The Tifayifu policy was encountered with strong objection from the Han Chinese, whose hairstyle remained mostly unchanged for over thousands of years, and has become part of the Han Chinese culture. As a result, the Qing government implemented the Tifayifu policy on Han Chinese people with increased pressure, resulting in many conflicts and massacres. It was not until early 20th century when the democratic revolutionaries began to view the queue as backward and advocated for adopting short hairstyles for men.

Uprisings against Tifayifu
The Manchu rulers made the Tifayifu policy increasingly stricter over the early years of the Qing dynasty, not only requiring all its male citizens to wear a queue, but also shaving their forehead. This was encountered with greater opposition from the Han Chinese than the queue, and hence onwards, Han rebels including those involved in the Taiping Rebellion grew hair on the front of their heads as a symbol of their rebellion against the Qing government even while retaining the queue. The Taiping rebels also forced everybody in their territory to grow out their hair, which in turn was disliked by many people who had, by then, grown accustomed to shaving their foreheads. Both the Qing forces and the rebels had a tendency to kill people for having the 'wrong' hairstyle.

During the final years of Ming, General Zheng Chenggong criticized the Qing hairstyle by referring to the shaven pate looking like a fly. Qing demanded Zheng Chenggong and his men to abide to the Tifayifu policy in exchange for recognizing Zheng Chenggong as a feudatory. However, Zheng Chenggong refused to surrender. The Qing also demanded that Zheng Jing and his men on Taiwan shave in order to receive recognition as a fiefdom. However, Zheng Jing's men and Ming prince Zhu Shugui fiercely objected to the shaving and adopting Manchu clothing, thus also refused to surrender.

Qing's compromise

In an attempt to alleviate the public discontentment toward Tifayifu policy, the Qing government eventually decided to adopt a series of compromise policies.

Furthermore, with the consent of the Qing government, traditional Ming dynasty Hanfu robes given by the Ming Emperors to the Chinese noble Dukes Yansheng descended from Confucius are still preserved in the Confucius Mansion after over five centuries. Robes from the Qing emperors are also preserved there. The Jurchens in the Jin dynasty and Mongols in the Yuan dynasty continued to patronize and support the Confucian Duke Yansheng.

Cultural significance
Proponents of the Hanfu Movement claim that hanfu's design bear special cultural moral and ethical values: "the left collar covering the right represents the perfection of human culture on human nature and the overcoming of bodily forces by the spiritual power of ethical ritual teaching; the expansive cutting and board sleeve represents a moral, concordant relation between nature and human creative power; the use of the girdle to fasten the garment over the body represents the constraints of Han culture to limit human's desire that would incur amoral deed. Therefore, the Hanfu Movement is part of the effort to promote traditional Chinese culture and values, and emphasize the sense of national pride and cultural identity among Chinese citizens.

Timeline of modern Hanfu Movement

 

In 2001, discontented netizens voiced out their opposition to the tangzhuang worn by Chinese politicians during the APEC summit. Those who opposed the tangzhuang viewed it as being of Manchu origin and was thus inappropriate to be worn as the national dress of China, since over 90% of its citizens are of Han ethnicity. They also believed that the Qing dynasty is responsible for the Century of Humiliation and the violent suppression of traditional Han Chinese culture. Consequently, tangzhuang is regarded by many as a symbol of weakness and corruption.

According to Asia Times Online, the broadly agreed modern Hanfu Movement may have begun around 2003. In November 2003, Wang Letian from Zhengzhou, China, publicly wore home-made shenyi-style hanfu. He was then interviewed by the Singaporean-Chinese journalist Zhang Congxing, who noticed Wang's photo on the internet with his hanfu and decided to write an article on him. This article was later published on the Singaporean newspaper Lianhe Zaobao. Wang Letian and his followers inspired others to reflect on the cultural identity of Han Chinese. They initiated the Hanfu Movement as an initiative in a broader effort to stimulate a Han Chinese cultural renaissance. In the same year of 2003, supporters of Hanfu Movement launched the website Hanwang to promote "traditional Han clothing". Hanfu enthusiasts around the year 2003 started wearing hanfu in public, building communities of Hanfu enthusiasts and organized activities related to hanfu and traditional Chinese culture.

In the early years of the Hanfu Movement, there were no existing stores to purchase hanfu. As such, the first manufacturers and sellers of Hanfu were the early Hanfu enthusiasts who possessed the necessary skills to DIY hanfu by themselves. They made hanfu in small quantities, and mainly relied on hanfu forums and enthusiasts communities to advertise their products.

Around the year 2005, the first online hanfu store appeared. Since then, more and more hanfu stores emerged both online and offline.

In 2006, the first physical hanfu store was opened under the trademark Chong Hui Han Tang (重回漢唐), which literally means "Coming back to the Han and Tang Dynasties" in Chengdu, Sichuan province of China.

From the year 2007, various hanfu-related clubs started to appear. These clubs focused on to organizing offline social activities in the instead of being largely online-based.

In 2007, a member of the CPPCC, Ye Hongming, proposed to define Hanfu as the national uniform. In the same year, a proposal to change the current western style academic dress to hanfu style was also made by Liu Minghua, a deputy of the National People's congress. In February 2007, advocates of hanfu submitted a proposal to the Chinese Olympic Committee to have it be the official clothing of the Chinese team in the 2008 Summer Olympics. The Chinese Olympic Committee rejected the proposal in April 2007.

In 2013, the first Xitang Hanfu Culture Week was held in the city of Xitang, Zhejiang province. Since then, it has been held successfully in subsequent years and is continue to be held annually.

In 2014, a project called Travelling with Hanfu was launched through the collaboration between Chinese photographer and freelancer Dang Xiaoshi, and Chinese actor Xu Jiao. Together, they posted series of photos online which quickly attracted many public attention.

In 2018, it was estimated that the hanfu market consisted of 2 million potential consumers. The estimated revenue sales for 2019 was 1.4 billion yuan ($199.3 million). According to the iiMedia 2018 survey, women make up 88.2% of the Hanfu enthusiasts and 75.8% of the Hanfu stores on Taobao and Tmall platforms only sell hanfu for women.

In 2019, it was estimated that there were 1,188 online hanfu stores on Tmall and Taobao which shows an increase of 45.77% over the previous year. The hanfu stores Chong Hui Han Tang ranked third on Tmall in 2019 after the hanfu store Hanshang Hualian and Shisanyu. In the 2019 edition of the Xitang Hanfu Culture Week, it was estimated that it attracted 40,000 Hanfu enthusiast participants.

By 2020, according to a study done by Forward Industry Research Institute (a Chinese research institute), the number of hanfu enthusiasts in China has reached 5.163 million, creating a market size equivalent to 6.36 billion yuan (US$980 million), a proportional increase of over 40% compared to the previous year.

In 2021, a lawmaker named Cheng Xinxiang submitted a proposal for a National Hanfu Day. This would take place on the Double Third Festival, or the third day of the third month on the Chinese Calendar. Meanwhile, it is projected that by the end of 2021, the total number of hanfu enthusiasts across China will exceed 7 million, and that the market size of hanfu will exceed nine billion yuan (US$1.39 billion).

Today, China faces an increasing need to establish a sense of national identity, and the Hanfu Movement is part of the movement to restore old customs and traditions, and to promote Chinese culture. In a larger scale, the Hanfu Movement is part of the Chinese Dream, or "the Great Rejuvenation of the Chinese Nation".

Definition of hanfu
According to Dictionary of Old Chinese Clothing, the term hanfu literally means "Clothing of the Han People." This term, which is not commonly used in ancient times, can be found in some historical records from Han, Tang, Song, Ming, Qing dynasties and the Republican era in China.

Chinese researcher Hua Mei, interviewed by student advocates of the Hanfu Movement in 2007, recognizes that defining hanfu is no simple matter, as there was no uniform style of Chinese fashion throughout the millennia of its history. Because of its constant evolution, she questions which period's style can rightly be regarded as traditional. Nonetheless, she explains that hanfu has historically been used to broadly refer to indigenous Chinese clothing in general. Observing that the apparel most often promoted by the movement are based on the Han-era quju and zhiju, she suggests that other styles, especially that of the Tang era, would also be candidates for revival in light of this umbrella definition.

Zhou Xing, cultural anthropologist and professor at Aichi University, states that the term hanfu was not commonly used in ancient times, and referred to some of the costumes worn by Hanfu Movement participants as being historically inaccurate, as they contain modern design elements. Like Hua, he noted that the term hanfu classically referred to the clothing worn by Han people in general, but he argued that there are differences between historical hanfu and the contemporary hanfu introduced by some participants of the movement.

On March 8, 2021, the magazine Vogue published an article on modern hanfu defining it as a "type of dress from any era when Han Chinese ruled".

Consensus on contemporary hanfu 
Throughout the Hanfu Movement, consensus regarding the main characteristics of that would determine whether a modern clothing falls into the category of hanfu have been reached by hanfu enthusiasts. These include flat cutting, cross collar garment with the right lapel covering the left, a wide and loose style, and the use of belts and lace as closures instead of buttons. Also, it is agreed upon that the hanfu costumes in some photo studios, movies, and TV dramas are not authentic representations of ancient hanfu, but contemporary hanfu modified based on ancient hanfu for the purposes of visual effects, cost saving and convenience of wearing.

Influence
Throughout the years, influence of the Hanfu Movement has reached the overseas Chinese diaspora and has led to the establishment of Hanfu Movement associations outside China, with the goal of promoting Chinese culture. While the Cheongsam tend to be used as the representative of the national identity in the previous generation of the overseas diaspora, nowadays, the young people within the overseas Chinese diaspora are more incline in the use of hanfu. According to iiMedia, in 2019, the number of Hanfu organizations outside of China was estimated to be around 2,000 whereas it was 1,300 in 2017; this marks an increase of 53.8%.

Controversy

Purists and reformists
Since the beginning of the Hanfu Movement, defining what would constitute as authentic hanfu has been a subject of debate and can even be a critical issue for hanfu event organizations, and diverse schools of thought have emerged. For example, the purists (the more conservative members of the group) believe in the replication of ancient garments as the only way to guarantee the authenticity of the hanfu, and that a hanfu cannot be called hanfu without reference to artefacts. Some other hanfu enthusiasts have embraced various modified styles of hanfu despite being different from historical artefacts, and considers hanfu to be authentic enough if they based themselves on ancient materials as the basis and follows the general hanfu principles. In other words, they consider both contemporary hanfu and ancient hanfu as hanfu. The reformists believe that the beauty and diversity of hanfu would be limited if they only limited themselves to the replication of archeological clothing artefacts. Some consider that the Hanfu Movement is not intended to completely imitate the ancient clothing as it would be difficult to replicate clothings that are identical to historical artefacts and 100% historically accurate. Instead they believe that the modern hanfu should incorporate modern aesthetics, including allowing some adjustments to the lengths of the attire or sleeves.

Intellectual property
Another controversy is the flooding of plagiarized copies of the hanfu on the market, which are sometimes of low-quality. This may damage the reputation of hanfu and discourage original designs. The reasons why people end up buying these plagiarized hanfu is partly due to their lack of knowledge in identifying genuine products from the fake ones. Other reasons why a consumer may purchase a plagiarized version of hanfu can be because the genuine product is out of stock in the market and the cheaper cost of purchasing a plagiarized one.

Han nationalism
In 2007, skeptics feared that there is an element of exclusivity which could brew ethnic tensions, especially if it were to be officially designated as the national costume of China (similar to the kimono of Japan, and hanbok of Korea), as the population of China consists of 56 officially recognized ethnicities, each of which has its own set of traditional clothing. For this reason, some extremists of the movement are labeled as "Han chauvinists". Nevertheless, hanfu advocates have stated that none of them have ever suggested that minorities must abandon their own indigenous styles of dress, and that personal preference for a style of fashion can be independent of political or nationalistic motives.

Students consulted by Hua Mei cited the persistence of indigenous clothing among Chinese minorities, and the usage of kimono in Japan, hanbok in Korea, and traditional clothing used in India as an inspiration for the Hanfu Movement. Even some ardent enthusiasts interviewed by the South China Morning Post in 2017, among them the Hanfu Society at Guangzhou University, have cautioned against extending the dress beyond social normalization among Han Chinese people, acknowledging the negative repercussions politicization of the movement may have on society. In the same vein of argument, in 2010, according to James Leibold, an associate professor in Chinese politics and Asian studies at La Trobe University, pioneers of the Hanfu Movement have confessed to believing that the issue of Han clothing cannot be separated from the larger issue of racial identity and political power in China. Nonetheless, he sites that the movement encompasses a very diverse group of individuals who find different sorts of meaning and enjoyment in the category of Han.

Kevin Carrico, an American scholar of contemporary Chinese society, professor of Macquarie University, criticized the hanfu for being an "invented style of dress" which "made the transition from a fantastic invented tradition to a distant image on a screen to a physical reality in the streets of China, in which one could wrap and recognise oneself". He maintains that there is no clear history indicating that there was any specific apparel in existence under the name hanfu. He also asserted there is a belief that the movement is inherently racial at its core, insists in that it is built on the narrative that the Manchu rulers of the Qing dynasty were single-mindedly dedicated to the destruction of the Han people and thus of China itself, fundamentally transforming Chinese society and shifting its essence "from civilisation to barbarism". He argues that real atrocities such as the Yangzhou massacre, during which Manchu soldiers devastated the city of Yangzhou, and the forceful imposition of the queue decree, are fused with the imaginary injustice of the forcible erasure of Han clothing. According to his research, underpinning the movement are conspiracy theories made by some hanfu advocates which claim that a secret Manchu plot for restoration has been underway since the start of the post-1978 reform era, such that the Manchus secretly control every important party-state institution, including the People’s Liberation Army, the Party Propaganda Department, the Ministry of Culture and especially the National Population and Family Planning Commission. Of note, Carrico's negative criticism towards the Hanfu Movement has been fully acknowledged at the beginning of his book to inform his readers of his own position. However, the reception of Carrico's arguments in his books have also been mixed in book reviews. Some elements of Carrico's critiques were found as being relevant and valid; for example, his critiques on the ideologies of the Hanfu Movement, the use of academic theories, as well as the ethnography section of the Hanfu Movement participants which may help in filling the gaps with the lack of research. However, some book reviewers were also concerned about the inaccurate portrayal of Chinese studies and contemporary anthropology in China, as well as the inaccurate and/or over-simplified portrayal of Chinese nationalism; for example, it was expressed that readers who are unfamiliar with China may feel that ethno-nationalism is representative of Chinese nationalism when in fact, there are varieties of different nationalist beliefs in China; while other authors perceived Carrico's contribution to the theorization of nationalism and understanding Chinese nationalism as being questionable. In another book review, an author expresses that people in China are proud of China and Chinese culture; however, the donning of traditional Chinese clothing is more likely for fun or relaxation than as being part of a sinister plot evolving around Han nationalist revival.  Carrico's arguments were also perceived by a book reviewer as seemingly suggesting that democratic systems are less likely to lead to the making ideal images of a nation than non-democratic countries. Other book reviewers have found attempts of Carrico's reflexivity as helpful on some elements but also noted the dismissal of ethnography in his reflections. Carrico's empathetic approach to his research was also criticized as not being explicitly expressed despite the latter had claimed on taking an empathetic approach towards his interlocutors; instead, Carrico was criticized for having repetitively brushing aside the narratives and lived-experience from his Chinese Hanfu Movement key informants despite his claims on listening to Chinese people in order to understand Chinese nationalism. Carrico was also perceived as having mainly offered alternative stories about China's past and failures during the Maoist era while the narratives of his key informants are almost non-existing in his book. Moreover, it was pointed out that Carrico has also left many unanswered questions, such as what are the other factors and ideological thoughts which also drive the Hanfu Movement beside the construct of imaginary identities, and on how foreigners, who participate in the Hanfu Movement and who are not ethnically Han Chinese, view the Hanfu Movement.

In January 2019, Eric Fish, a freelance writer who lived in China from 2007 to 2014 as a teacher, student, and journalist, and is a specialist on China's millennial generation, believed that the Hanfu Movement does have "patriotic undertones" but "most Hanfu enthusiasts are in it for the fashion and community more than a racial or xenophobic motivation". He also mentioned that, contrary to popular belief, China's "young people overall are progressively getting less nationalistic".

See also
Hanfu
Chinese Clothing
History of China
Chinese Culture
Guzhuang – Fantasy-based Chinese costumes inspired by ancient Chinese clothing

References

Hanfu
2003 establishments in China
2003 in fashion
21st-century social movements
Chinese clothing
Social movements in China
Subcultures
Han Chinese
History of Asian clothing